Teodor Kocerka (6 August 1927 – 25 September 1999) was a Polish rower who competed in the 1952 Summer Olympics, those of 1956, and those of 1960.

He was born in Bydgoszcz in the mid-north of Poland and died in Warsaw.

Olympic events competed
In 1952 he won the bronze medal in single sculling.

Four years later he finished fourth in the same event.

At the 1960 Games he won his second bronze in the single sculls.

In the same years as the two bronzes he was pre-selected flagbearer for the Polish Olympic squad.

Major competition wins
He took gold at single sculling at the 1955 European championships.

That same year he won the Diamond Challenge Sculls ('Diamonds') at Henley Royal Regatta, by a length and a half over Sid Rand. He won the next year's event by four lengths, over TA Fox of London RC.  His last such final was in 1960, losing by half a length to Stuart Mackenzie of Henley's highly selective Leander Club, not breaking the latter rower's six-year success.  By that time Kocerka had changed chosen club from AZS Bydgoszcz to AZS Szczecin.

References

1927 births
1999 deaths
Polish male rowers
Olympic rowers of Poland
Rowers at the 1952 Summer Olympics
Rowers at the 1956 Summer Olympics
Rowers at the 1960 Summer Olympics
Olympic bronze medalists for Poland
Sportspeople from Bydgoszcz
Olympic medalists in rowing
Medalists at the 1960 Summer Olympics
Medalists at the 1952 Summer Olympics
European Rowing Championships medalists